Fang La (died 1121) was a fictional Chinese rebel leader who led an uprising against the Song dynasty. In the classical novel Water Margin, he is fictionalised as one of the primary antagonists and nemeses of the 108 Stars of Destiny. He is sometimes associated with Manichaeism but was most likely not a follower of the religion.

Life
Fang La was from Shezhou, which is roughly present-day She County, Anhui. However, other sources claimed that he was from Qingxi County, which is present-day Chun'an County, Zhejiang. In 1120, he led an uprising against the Song Empire in Qixian Village, Shezhou. Others claimed that he started the rebellion in Wannian District, Chun'an County. Fang La's forces captured Hangzhou and subsequently took control over parts of present-day Jiangsu, Zhejiang, Anhui and Jiangxi provinces, with a total of 52 counties and six prefectures.

In 1121, the Song government sent a general, Wang Yuan, to lead an army to crush the rebellion. Wang Yuan's subordinate, Han Shizhong, disguised himself, infiltrated Qingxi County and captured Fang La. Later, Xin Xingzong, the Song general defending Zhongzhou, led his troops to block Qingxi County's exit route and regained control of the county. Fang La and 52 of his subordinates were captured and escorted by the general Tong Guan to the imperial capital, Kaifeng. Four months later, Fang La was found guilty of treason and executed in Kaifeng.

By 1132–1133 or later, the rebellion was linked to Manichaeism. Though not originally connected, in the public and historical conscience it became confused with the Taizhou unrest of April–June 1121, where Manichaeism was widespread.

In Water Margin
The classical novel Water Margin presents a semi-fictional account of Fang La and his battle with the Liangshan outlaws. After granting the outlaws amnesty, Emperor Huizong sends them on military campaigns to suppress rebel forces within the Song Empire and counter invaders from the Liao Empire in the north. Fang La is one of the rebel leaders based in the Jiangnan region.

Whilst the Liangshan forces suffered hardly any casualties in the campaigns against the Liao Empire and the rebel forces of Tian Hu and Wang Qing, the campaign against Fang La proved to be calamitous. 59 of the original 108 heroes were killed in action, mostly by Fang La's warriors, whose combat skills and abilities rival the best of Liangshan. Unlike the other rebels who lack good leadership and experience, Fang La has established a solid foundation in the Jiangnan region with many capable people serving under him.

Fang La is eventually captured by the Liangshan heroes after an elaborate infiltration scheme involving Chai Jin and Yan Qing. During his escape attempt, he is defeated by Lu Zhishen and escorted back to Kaifeng by imperial troops under Tong Guan. Four months later, Fang La is found guilty of treason and executed by lingchi.

See also 
 Chen Shuozhen (Female Emperor Wenjia)

References

 
 
 
 
 
 
 

1121 deaths
People executed by the Song dynasty
Song dynasty rebels
People from Huangshan
Year of birth unknown
People executed by flaying